John Denis Taylor (18 February 1923  - 14 March 1991) is a former English cricketer. Taylor was a right-handed batsman.

Taylor made his first-class debut for Hampshire against Lancashire in the 1947 County Championship, in which Taylor performed well from a lower-order position. Blake made two appearances in that season, with the other coming against Yorkshire, which saw Hampshire bat well once again, but the team's innings of 308 all out was overshadowed by Len Hutton's season-best score of 270 not out, which included a fifth-wicket partnership of 373 runs with fellow Test batsman Norman Yardley

Taylor next represented Hampshire in 1949, making his final County Championship appearance against Nottinghamshire. Taylor's final first-class appearance for the club came against a Combined Services side. Taylor represented the Hampshire Second XI in the Minor Counties Championship during 1949 and played his last match representing a Hampshire side in August against Gloucestershire Second XI.

External links
John Taylor at Cricinfo
John Taylor at CricketArchive

1923 births
1991 deaths
Cricketers from Ipswich
English cricketers
Hampshire cricketers